Justine Schofield (born 29 October 1985) is an Australian cook, author and television presenter.

Early life
Schofield was born on 29 October 1985 in Sydney to an Australian father and a French mother. She has an elder brother. When Françoise came to Australia, she opened a restaurant in Bowral. 
Schofield attended Santa Sabina College where she gained her Higher School Certificate in 2003. She studied for a diploma in hotel management and went on to work in sales.

Television
In 2009, Schofield was selected for the first series of MasterChef Australia. She was eliminated in fourth place.

Schofield was subsequently offered her own program, Everyday Gourmet with Justine Schofield, on Network Ten. She has recorded more than 700 episodes over eight series. The program also has spinoff series, including Tropical Gourmet Queensland, Tropical Gourmet: New Caledonia and Justine's Flavours of Fuji.

In 2019, Schofield competed in the fifth season of I'm a Celebrity...Get Me Out of Here!, set in Kruger National Park, South Africa. She was eliminated eighth on 7 February 2019.

Books
Schofield has written three books:

The Weeknight Cookbook (2019) 
Simple Every Day (2017) 
Dinner with Justine (2016)

Personal life
From 2014 to 2017, Schofield was in a relationship with television journalist Matt Doran. In 2019, she said she had been single for two years. Schofield has been in a relationship with ex-AFL player Brent Staker since early 2020. On 8 May 2022, the couple announced that they were expecting a child. They had a son in September 2022.

Schofield lives in Clovelly, New South Wales.

References

1985 births
Living people
Australian people of French descent
People from Sydney
Australian television chefs
MasterChef Australia
Australian writers
I'm a Celebrity...Get Me Out of Here! (Australian TV series) participants